Route nationale 2 (RN2) is a highway in French Guiana, an overseas region and department of France in South America. The highway connects Cayenne with Saint-Georges and measures . The highway provides a direct connection to Brazil.

Overview
The highway starts in Balata, a suburb of Cayenne, at an intersection with Route nationale 1. The road was initially built to connect Cayenne with the Cayenne – Félix Eboué Airport. In 1970s, the road was extended to Régina as an unpaved road. In the 1990s, work began on extending the road to Saint-Georges. In 2003, the road to Saint-Georges was opened. In 2014, a grade-separated intersection with Route nationale 1 was constructed.  The Oyapock River Bridge over the Oyapock River was opened on 18 March 2017 linking French Guiana with Brazil.

The amount of traffic on Route nationale 2 varies greatly. In 2010, before the bridge opened, the average daily traffic was 23,185 vehicles per day at Balata, and fell to 438 vehicles in Saint-Georges.

References

External links

Roads in French Guiana